Leak 04-13 (Bait Ones) is a demo album by British musician Jai Paul, released as his debut project. It was released on 1 June 2019 through XL Recordings, marking seven years since Paul last released solo music with the 2012 single "Jasmine". The album consists of demos intended for what would have been his debut studio album, Bait Ones. However, it was initially leaked from a low-quality CD-R stolen from Paul and sold through Bandcamp under the unofficial title Jai Paul on 13 April 2013. A City of London Police investigation—along with direct cooperation from Bandcamp and PayPal—could not uncover the leaker's identity, and Paul characterised the incident as traumatic, taking an extended hiatus from music. In later years, Paul felt comfortable with officially releasing the album as sequenced by the user who originally stole and illegally uploaded it.

Only the singles "BTSTU" and "Jasmine", which had been critically acclaimed, were previously officially released. The album was released alongside a "double B-side" single featuring two songs recorded during the same sessions, "Do You Love Her Now" and "He". The demo album received widespread acclaim both when it was originally leaked and later officially released; many deemed the album as ahead of its time and a significant influence on subsequent R&B and popular music in general.

Background
Paul gained media attention in 2010 with a 2007 demo of his song "BTSTU", followed by its release as a single through XL Recordings in 2011. Paul continued recording more music for an album under the working title Bait Ones. In 2012, Paul released his second single "Jasmine (Demo)".

In April 2013, a user illegally uploaded a collection of leaked recordings to Bandcamp as an album titled Jai Paul, which was later taken down. Paul said he was in "complete shock" after learning of the leak, which he believes was from a "burned CD that got misplaced". Despite reporting the leak to police and the police later finding those responsible and having their PayPal accounts frozen, Paul said he found it "very difficult to deal with" that sections of the public and media thought he leaked the music himself, and constantly being asked about it was the primary reason for him feeling a "loss of trust" and why he "withdrew from life in general" for several years. Paul also said that having the "dream" of how one gets to present their music themselves "torn up in front of" him greatly affected him, and only in 2019, after "therapy of various kinds", has he begun to "think about returning to music", saying he did not want to deny the public the chance to hear the unfinished music officially any longer.

Critical reception

2013 leak
Many publications opted to review the leaked material as an "album" with Gigwise commenting "there are moments that sound distinctly unfinished. There are periods of silence at the end of most tracks, there're only a few smooth segues between the skits and the tracks, and there are periods where the mixing of the vocal track sounds downright bad. The whole album doesn't feel as precisely balanced as you would expect from Jai Paul."

Despite being an unofficial release, the collection of leaked material was ranked as an album in year-end lists, at number 32 in the music blog Pretty Much Amazing's "40 Best Albums of 2013", number 28 in The Guardians "Best Albums of 2013", and number 20 in Pitchfork's "Top 50 Albums of 2013". More recently, the leak was ranked at number 99 in "The 100 Best Albums of the Decade So Far", a list published by Pitchfork in August 2014.

Official release 

Writing for The Fader, contributor Shaad D'Souza wrote "Six years on, that record is finally officially out, and still sounds like a cross-cultural marvel." Rory Foster, writing for The Line of Best Fit wrote that "by coming to terms with the past and allowing its release, Jai has allowed fans new and old to come together over this music; music that sent huge ripples round the internet, to many of today's greatest artists. In 2013 we lost sight of Jai Paul, but we gained this perfect, imperfect record. And as Jai says, we cannot put that shit back in the box. So it seems best to just celebrate what is one of the great records of the decade, finally available to everyone." Pitchfork writer Ryan Domal called the album "the sound of borders breaking, of traditions mingling, of a utopian closeness that so often seems so far away."

Pitchfork listed the album at number 95 for the 200 best albums of the 2010s. Warm Visions listed the album at number 44 for the 200 Best Albums of the 2010s.

Accolades

Track listing
All tracks written by Jai Paul, except where noted. 

Samples
 "One of the Bredrins" contains a sample of "Magic", performed by ProDot.
 "Str8 Outta Mumbai" contains a sample of "Bala Main Bairagan Hoongi", written by Vani Jairam and Ravi Shankar, and performed by Vani Jairam.
 "Crush" is a cover of "Crush", written by Andy Goldmark, Kevin Clark, Berry Cosgrove and Clifford Mueller.
 "Baby Beat" contains a sample of "All My Life", written and performed by K-Ci & JoJo.
 "Chix" contains a sample of Adagio for Strings, written and performed by Samuel Barber.

Personnel
Credits adapted from Jai Paul's website and Tidal.
Jai Paul – vocals , guitars , electric guitar , drums , synthesizers , programming , SFX , sound design , engineering , mixing
Anup Paul – bass guitar , additional vocals , sound design , additional engineering 
Sam Pickering – saxophone 
Duncan Fuller – engineering
Lexxx – engineering
Guy Davie – mastering

Charts

Weekly charts

Notes

References

2019 debut albums
XL Recordings albums
Demo albums
Copyright infringement